Aechmea prava is a plant species in the genus Aechmea. This species is endemic to the State of Rio de Janeiro in Brazil.

References

prava
Flora of Brazil
Plants described in 1972